John Stephen Michael "Deacon" Donahue (June 23, 1920 – March 6, 2008) was a relief pitcher in Major League Baseball who played from 1943 through 1944 for the Philadelphia Phillies. He was born in Chicago, Illinois.

Donahue was one of several players who only appeared in the majors during World War II. In eight relief appearances, he posted a 0–2 record with a 6.75 earned run average with no saves, giving up 11 runs (one unearned) on 22 hits and three walks while striking out three in 13 innings of work.

Following his baseball career, Donahue worked as a movie theatre projectionist in the Chicago area for 40 years. He died in Glenview, Illinois, at the age of 87.

References

External links

1920 births
2008 deaths
Baseball players from Chicago
Danville-Schoolfield Leafs players
Green Bay Bluejays players
Indianapolis Indians players
Major League Baseball pitchers
Owensboro Oilers players
Philadelphia Phillies players
Pocomoke City Red Sox players
Utica Blue Sox players
Utica Braves players